Old Coppice is a hamlet in Shropshire, England. It is situated between Lyth Hill and Great Lyth.

Villages in Shropshire
Shrewsbury and Atcham